Frank Connor (September 30, 1916 – April 1982) was an American politician in the state of Washington. He served in the Washington State Senate and Washington House of Representatives

References

1916 births
1982 deaths
Democratic Party Washington (state) state senators
20th-century American politicians
Democratic Party members of the Washington House of Representatives